Joshua A. Chafetz (born 1979) is a law professor at Georgetown University. Before arriving at Georgetown in 2020, he was a professor of law at Cornell University for twelve years. His mother was noted sociologist Janet Saltzman Chafetz.

Works

References

1979 births
Living people
Cornell University faculty
Georgetown University faculty